Bishop Ludden Junior/Senior High School is a private, Catholic high school in Syracuse, New York.  It is located within the Roman Catholic Diocese of Syracuse.

History
Bishop Ludden Junior-Senior High School was founded in 1963 as a Catholic college preparatory high school for young men and women in the Western Region of the Syracuse Diocese. Chartered by the New York State Board of Regents, the school is a member of the Middle States Association of Colleges and Secondary Schools.

Bishop Ludden is named in honor of the first Bishop of the Diocese of Syracuse, Bishop Patrick Anthony Ludden. In 2014, Principal David Pepe was replaced by Ms. Brenda Reichart. Also in 2010, Bishop Ludden transitioned to a "Principal/President" model in which the Principal oversees the daily operations of the school, while the President oversees the financial viability of the institution in conjunction with the Office of Catholic Schools, Diocese of Syracuse. In 2017 Brenda Reichart was replaced by Leo Cosgrove.

Notable alumni
 Terry McAuliffe, former Democratic Party National Chairman, Governor of Virginia (2013-2017) — Class of 1975
 John Johnstone, Major League Baseball pitcher 1993–2000 — Class of 1987
 John Katko, Assistant U.S. Attorney, Member of The United States House of Representatives (2015 - 2017) - Class of 1980
 Robert Wood, engineer

References

External links
 

Catholic secondary schools in New York (state)
Educational institutions established in 1963
Roman Catholic Diocese of Syracuse
Education in Syracuse, New York
Schools in Onondaga County, New York
Private middle schools in New York (state)
1963 establishments in New York (state)